The Copa do Craque de Masters (also known as Copa Zico), was the third edition of the World Cup of Masters. For the third time running it was held in Brazil, over the course of January 1990. Returning to the format of the first tournament, there were five "Senior" teams, now addressed as "Masters".

The teams were hosts and reigning champions Brazil, Argentina, Italy and for the first time Netherlands and Poland. Brazil beat easily Holland in the final by the wide margin of 5-0, lifted the trophy and won the $20,000 award.

Results

Group table

Third-place play-off

Final

Match details

Goal scorers

4 goals
  Lesław Ćmikiewicz
  Johnny Rep

3 goals
  Claudio Adao
  Zico

2 goals
  Grzegorz Lato
  Miguel Ángel Brindisi
  Rene van de Kerkhof
  Serginho Chulapa
  Eder
  Franco Causio

1 goal
  Fernando Alí
  Daniel Brailovsky
  Norberto Outes
  Cafuring
  Wladimir
  Hugo Hovenkamp
  Peter Boeve
  Dabrowski
  Zdzisław Puszkarz
  Giancarlo Antognoni
  Roberto Pruzzo

Own goal
  Rene van de Kerkhof
  Kazimierz Kmiecik

Champion

References

World Cup of Masters events
1990
1990 in Brazilian football
1989–90 in Argentine football
1989–90 in Dutch football
1989–90 in German football
1989–90 in Italian football
1989–90 in Polish football